Mattis is a male given name, a Norwegian form of Matthew, and also a short form for Matthias. Notable people with the name include:

Given name
 Mattis Hætta (1959–2022), Norwegian singer
 Mattis Mathiesen (1924–2010), Norwegian photographer and film director
 Mattis Næss (born 1973), Norwegian sprint canoer

Last name
 Anne Tamar-Mattis, American attorney, human rights advocate, and founder of interACT 
 Dwayne Mattis (born 1981), professional footballer
 Everton Mattis (born 1957), cricketer
 Guilherme Mattis (born 1990), football player
 James Mattis (born 1950), American general and former Secretary of Defense
 Peter Mattis, computer programmer
 Ralph Mattis (1890–1960), baseball player
 Sam Mattis (born 1994), athlete
 Shane Mattis (born 1980), professional goalkeeper from Jamaica
 Tyesha Mattis (born 1999), British artistic gymnast

See also
 Mattis v Pollock, English tort law case
 Mattis Point, Newfoundland and Labrador